The Titicaca National Reservation is located in the Puno Region, Peru, in the Puno and Huancané provinces. Its main purpose is to preserve the ecosystems and landscapes of the Titicaca lake and surrounding Central Andean wet puna ecoregion.

See also
Iperu, tourist information and assistance
Tourism in Peru

References

External links 
 Map of the Puno Region showing the two parts of Titicaca National Reservation
 www.enjoyperu.com / Titicaca National Reservation (Spanish)

National Reservations of Peru
Lake Titicaca
Geography of Puno Region